The Cal State Northridge Matadors women's basketball team is the women's college basketball program representing California State University, Northridge. The team currently competes in the Big West Conference of the NCAA's Division I.

NCAA Tournament appearances

NCAA Division I tournament results
The Matadors have made four appearances in the NCAA Division I women's basketball tournament. They had a combined record of 0–4.

NCAA Division II tournament results
The Matadors made two appearances in the NCAA Division II women's basketball tournament. They had a combined record of 2–2.

History
As of the end of the 2015–16 season, the Matadors have an all-time record of 461–687. They previously played in the Big Sky Conference until 2001. They have made the NCAA Tournament three times, losing each time in the First Round.

References

External links